Timofey Timofeyevich Khryukin (in Yeysk19 July 1953, in Moscow) was a Soviet aviator, Spanish Civil War volunteer, and colonel-general of the Soviet Air Force. Emerging from an impoverished working-class background, he rose to command the 8th Air Army and 1st Air Army during the Second World War, being twice decorated as a Hero of the Soviet Union before his death following a period of illness caused by a road accident.

Early life
Khryukin's father worked a mason; his mother assisted supporting the family as a laundrywoman working for petty wages. At the age of eight he began working for well-off cossacks, but due to abuse he eventually ran off, spending several years wandering the countryside in the years preceding the Bolshevik Revolution. His formal education did not began until at age 15 in the midst of the socialist campaigns to eradicate illiteracy; around that time he found employment in various jobs involving manual labor, including as a porter and railway depot employee. 

After joining the Komsomol in 1926, he made his way to regional secretary of the organization and joined the Communist Party of the Soviet Union in 1929. Following a brief stint at an agricultural school, he joined Soviet military and entered flight school in 1932.

Military career 
Having joined the military in 1932, he was sent to for training at the Voroshilovgrad Military Aviation School of Pilots in Luhansk, which lasted eight months. Khryukin went to Spain as a volunteer for the Spanish Republican Air Force in August 1936. There he participated in the Spanish Civil War as a Tupolev SB bomber pilot, remaining until March 1937 and receiving the Order of the Red Banner upon his return to the Soviet Union. 

The following year he went to China to lead a squadron of Soviet-piloted Tupolev SB-2 with the Chinese Air Force, sent by the Soviet Union to aid the Chinese forces in the Second Sino-Japanese War. Khryukin received the title of Hero of the Soviet Union on 22 February 1939. 

He served as the Air Forces commander of the 14th Soviet Army during the Soviet Army's Finnish campaign in 1939-1940 before being named Assistant General Inspector of the Air Force in 1940.

In May 1940 Khryukin was promoted to division commanderbecoming Major-General Khryukin of the Air Force when the classic generals' ranks, abolished following the October Revolution, were brought into the Red Army the following month.

World War II
Khryukin was appointed commander of the Air Forces of the 12th Soviet Army (based in Ukrainian Soviet Socialist Republic's Kiev Special Military District) on 27 May 1941, twenty-six days before to the German invasion of the Soviet Union. Khryukin was placed in charge of the air units attached the Karelian Front in August 1941: these were tasked with securing the Murmansk Railway and the Kirov Railway, significant to the Soviet military and war effort as the connection between Karelia and the rest of the European territory of the Russian Soviet Federative Socialist Republic. In June 1942 he was reassigned to the Southwestern Front, just in time for the Nazi advance against Stalingrad. The Air Force units of the Southwestern Front were subsequently reformed as the 8th Air Army under Khryukin, as announced by the People's Commissar for Defense on 9 June.

Khryukin's Eight Army participated in the Battle of Stalingrad from the very beginning of the German assault. Stalin personally ordered General Vasily Gordov of the Stalingrad Front to instruct Khryukin to launch a massive aerial assault against the Germans to the right flank of the Soviet forces during a conversation by direct wire on 23 July 1942. A less-than-desirable number of aircraft translated into insufficient resources for aerial reconnaissance, while Il-2 Shturmovik units had to fly without fighter escort. Although it could not stop the German forces from advancing into the city, the 8th Air Army would continue to provide key support during the Battle of Stalingrad until the battle turned in the Soviets favor. In early October Khryukin decided to form a regiment within the 8th Air Army composed of elite fighter pilots, to be led by World War II ace Lev Shestakov, a fellow Spanish Civil War veteran; the unit became the prestigious 9th Guards Fighter Aviation Regiment. By the end of 1942, Khryukin increased the count of enemy aircraft pilots had to destroy in order to attain the status of ace; simultaneously, he promised a recommendation for the Hero of the Soviet Union title to each of those who could succeed in doing so. On 30 December 1942 the 8th Air Army became part of the Southern Front; Khryukin's efforts turned in the direction of Rostov and the Donbas, where major Soviet victories followed the surrender of Germany's Stalingrad forces after the success of the Soviet counterattackOperation Little Saturnin early 1943.

With successful Soviet advances in the Donbas, Khryukin's airmen won praise from Stalin, who called for artillery salvoes to commemorate the Soviet triumph in Moscow in September 1943. After supporting the Red Army on the Mius River and in the retaking of the Donbas region of eastern Ukraine, the 8th Air Army lent air superiority to the Soviet offensive in Crimea in April 1944.

Khryukin took charge of the 1st Air Army from Colonel-General Mikhail Gromov's command in July 1944, following his promotion to colonel-general in May. Its performance under the freshly transferred Khryukin during Operation Bagration in Belarus was noted as "excellent" by Marshal of the Soviet Union Vasilevsky, an eyewitness, in his memoirs, The Matter of My Whole Life (1973). Khryukin commanded the 1st Air Army for the remainder of the war, leading it for the remainder of the war and commanding it during the key Battle of Königsberg in the last stages of the war (6–9 April 1945). His second Hero of the Soviet Union title was awarded on 19 April 1945, ten days following the Soviet victory in the offensive.

Postwar
Khryukin remained in command of the 1st Air Army until July 1946 before appointed as deputy commander of training of the Soviet Air Force from 1946 to 1947; after that he commanded the 7th Air Army. In 1950 he graduated from the Voroshilov Academy of the General Staff of the Armed Forces of the USSR. His health was seriously undermined by a car accident after the war, although his life was saved by a successful surgery. He died of progressive nephritis on 19 July 1953 and was buried in Novodevichy Cemetery.

Awards and honors 

 Twice Hero of the Soviet Union (22 February 1939 and 19 April 1945)
 Order of Lenin (22 February 1939)
 Three Order of the Red Banner (2 February 1937, 7 May 1940, and 20 April 1953)
 Order of Bogdan Khmelnitsky 1st class (19 March 1944)
 Order of Suvorov 1st and 2nd class (1st class - 16 May 1944; 2nd class - 17 September 1943)
 Two Order of Kutuzov 1st class (8 February 1943 and 4 July 1944)
 Order of the Patriotic War 2nd class (23 November 1942)
 Order of the Red Star (6 November 1947)
 Legion of Honour (31 May 1944)
 Croix de Guerre (June 1945)
 Order of the Cloud and Banner 4th class (1938)

References

Bibliography
 
 

1910 births
1953 deaths
People from Yeysk
People from Kuban Oblast
Communist Party of the Soviet Union members
Soviet Air Force generals
Soviet colonel generals
Heroes of the Soviet Union
Russian people of the Spanish Civil War
Soviet World War II pilots
Soviet military personnel of World War II
Soviet people of the Second Sino-Japanese War
Soviet people of the Spanish Civil War
Military Academy of the General Staff of the Armed Forces of the Soviet Union alumni
Burials at Novodevichy Cemetery
Recipients of the Order of the Red Banner
Recipients of the Order of Suvorov, 1st class
Recipients of the Order of Kutuzov, 1st class
Recipients of the Order of Bogdan Khmelnitsky (Soviet Union), 1st class
Recipients of the Order of Kutuzov, 2nd class
Commandeurs of the Légion d'honneur
Recipients of the Croix de Guerre 1939–1945 (France)